Eudes (also Oto, Odo, Odon) of Metz (742–814) was an architect who lived during Charlemagne's reign in the Carolingian Empire, and is the earliest known architect born north of the Alps. He was of Armenian origin.

Style 
His Carolingian architecture with polygonal plans and elaborate elevations of the buildings he created are a reminiscence of the Basilica of San Vitale of Ravenna and late Roman architecture with Byzantine style. It is unknown whether he saw these buildings himself, or only drawings of them.

Eudes had a large technical knowledge from De architectura by Vitruvius, as many Carolingian Renaissance era manuscripts of this Vitruvius's works exist.

Works 
Eudes of Metz is credited as the architect of:
 Charlemagne's Palace of Aachen with the Palatine Chapel (792–805), in Aachen
 the church of Germigny-des-Prés in 806–811.

See also
Carolingian art
Carolingian Renaissance
Germigny-des-Prés

References

742 births
814 deaths
8th-century Frankish people
Medieval architects
People from the Carolingian Empire
Date of birth unknown
Date of death unknown
Place of birth unknown
Place of death unknown
8th-century architects
9th-century architects